Paropsisterna agricola or southern eucalyptus leaf beetle, is a small hemispherical leaf beetle. They can vary from golden to grey. They have some black markings on the pronotum. The epipleura (skirt) is sometimes red.

This species has the ability to increase population very rapidly and can become a commercial pest to the timber industry attacking plantation forests.

References

Beetles of Australia
Chrysomelinae
Taxa named by Félicien Chapuis